Wild West is a British television sitcom that aired from 22 October 2002 to 13 April 2004, starring Dawn French and Catherine Tate. It was described as a dark comedy from the pen of Simon Nye and was filmed on location in Portloe, Cornwall. Set in the hamlet of St Gweep, Wild West observes the strange goings-on in the local Cornish community. Shop owners Mary Trewednack and her life-partner Angela Phillips are the main focus but there are many other characters in this sitcom.

The first series of the sitcom was scheduled to appear on prime-time BBC1 where its eccentricities met with a poor critical and popular response, but a second series was commissioned and both series have received retrospective praise.

Plot

The action centres around Angela Phillips (Tate) and Mary Trewednack (French), a lesbian couple who run the local town store and post office. Though self-avowed lesbians, halfway through the first series Mary comments that the only reason they are a couple is because they were the only two people in town who weren't already in a relationship when they met. Some plots of first series episodes revolve around both of them pursuing romances with men and the jealousy the other partner experiences; by the second series, all mentions of a lesbian relationship are completely dropped, including a recurring gag during the opening credits that showed them in bed together. This is resolved in the final episode of the show.

Mary and Angela are friends with the village locals, including Holly (Duff/Weaver), owner of the local witchcraft centre; Harry (Mylan,) a young local hippy; Old Jake (Bradley,) who runs the local boat tour; Jeff (Foley), a swinger and sexual deviant who owns the local pub with his deaf wife Daphne; and PC Alan Allen (Wright), the somewhat bumbling policeman who becomes Mary's major romantic interest in series 2.

Each episode centers on a new situation that has come into the lives of the characters and how they deal with it, generally with a focus on the different ways in which Mary and Angela meddle in everyone's lives.

Episodes

Series One

Series Two

References

External links

Portloe

2002 British television series debuts
2004 British television series endings
2000s British sitcoms
British fantasy television series
BBC television sitcoms
2000s British LGBT-related drama television series
Lesbian-related television shows
Television shows set in Cornwall
Television series produced at Pinewood Studios